The two-clawed worm-skink (Anomalopus leuckartii) is a species of skink found in New South Wales and Queensland in Australia.

References

Anomalopus
Reptiles described in 1862
Taxa named by David Friedrich Weinland